Lichtenberger is a German surname. Notable people with the surname include:

 André Lichtenberger (1870–1940), French novelist and sociologist
 Andrew Lichtenberger (born 1987), American professional poker player
 Armando Lichtenberger Jr., American musician and producer
 Arthur C. Lichtenberger (1900–1968), American Anglican bishop
 Elisabeth Lichtenberger (1925–2017), Austrian geographer
 Eva Lichtenberger (born 1954), Austrian politician
 Frédéric Auguste Lichtenberger (1832–1899), French theologian
 Harold Lichtenberger (1920–1993), American physicist
 Henri Lichtenberger (1864–1941), French academic
 Hermann Lichtenberger (1892–1959), Luftwaffe general
 Hermann Lichtenberger (born 1943), German professor at University of Tübingen
 Johannes Lichtenberger (died 1503), German astrologer
 Louis Lichtenberger (1835–1892), American businessman

See also 
 Ulrich Hesse-Lichtenberger
 Lichtenberg (disambiguation)

German-language surnames